Merry Nickmas is a 2012 holiday album that was released on November 19, 2012. The album features musical artists associated or popularized by Nickelodeon like Drake Bell, Miranda Cosgrove, Victoria Justice, Big Time Rush, Jennette McCurdy, Ariana Grande, Elizabeth Gillies, Cymphonique Miller and Rachel Crow singing their own versions of holiday songs. Some songs were recorded prior to the production of this album, while others were recorded specifically for it. It was released in compact disc, digital download, and streaming formats.

Track listing

It's Not Christmas Without You 

"It's Not Christmas Without You" is a song performed by Victorious cast featuring Victoria Justice for the TV series Victorious.

Charts

References 

Christmas compilation albums
2012 Christmas albums
Pop rock Christmas albums
Pop compilation albums
2012 compilation albums
Teen pop albums
Pop rock compilation albums
Columbia Records compilation albums